The 2017 Mid-Eastern Athletic Conference men's basketball tournament took place March 6–11, 2017 at the Norfolk Scope in Norfolk, Virginia. The champion, North Carolina Central, received the conference's automatic bid to the 2017 NCAA tournament with a 67–59 win over Norfolk State in the championship game.

Seeds 
The top 12 teams were eligible for the tournament, Savannah State was ineligible for postseason play due to APR Sanctions.

Teams were seeded by record within the conference, with a tiebreaker system to seed teams with identical conference records.

Schedule

Bracket

* denotes overtime period

References

2016–17 Mid-Eastern Athletic Conference men's basketball season
MEAC men's basketball tournament
2017 in sports in Virginia
Basketball competitions in Norfolk, Virginia
College basketball tournaments in Virginia